Sepak takraw was contested at the 2010 Asian Games in Guangzhou, China by both men and women from November 16 to 27 2010. Team, Regu, and Doubles competitions were all involved in the Sepak takraw competition with all games taking place at Haizhu Sports Center. Each country, except the host country, was limited to two entries per gender.

Schedule

Medalists

Men

Women

Medal table

Participating nations
A total of 172 athletes from 10 nations competed in sepak takraw at the 2010 Asian Games:

References

External links
Official Sepak takraw Site of 2010 Asian Game

 
2010 Asian Games events
2010